Guillermo Vassaux (25 June 1909 – 31 May 2006), full name Guillermo Enrique Vassaux Estévez, was a Guatemalan chess player, teacher, and writer, and fourteen-time winner of the Guatemalan Chess Championship from 1934 to 1973.

Biography
Guillermo Vassaux was one of the founders of the Guatemalan National Chess Federation in 1939. In 1953 he was called one of the three great Guatemalan chess figures of the time along with Enrique Hidalgo and Carlos Enrique Salazar. He won the Guatemalan Chess Championship fourteen times over a 40-year span, in 1934, 1935, 1936, 1938, 1939, 1947, 1948, 1949, 1956, 1957, 1958, 1959, 1970, and 1973.

In international play, Guillermo Vassaux represented Guatemala in a match against El Salvador in 1930, the first chess match contested by two Central American countries. He participated in the Chess Olympiad once, representing Guatemala at first board in the 8th Chess Olympiad in 1939 in Buenos Aires, scoring five wins, two draws, and eight losses.

Later, Guillermo Vassaux participated in the first Canadian Open Chess Championship in 1956. He played for Guatemala in the CACAC Team Chess Championships (1968, 1971) and won an individual gold medal in 1971.

Guillermo Vassaux authored three chess books and wrote a regular chess column in the Prensa Libre from 1974 to 1991. From 1971 to 1991, he ran a chess program "Ajedrez bajo los árboles" in Minerva Park in Zone 2 of Guatemala City. His students there included future national champions Carlos Juárez, Carlos Reyes and Pablo Rodas. In recognition of his dedication to Guatemalan chess, he was awarded a Medal of Honour by the Ministry of Culture and Sports and the Presidential Medal by Óscar Berger shortly before his death.

References

External links

Guillermo Vassaux chess games at 365chess.com

1909 births
2006 deaths
Guatemalan chess players
Chess Olympiad competitors
20th-century chess players
Sportspeople from Guatemala City